Syed Mahabubullah (born 15 June 1958) is a Bangladeshi former cricket umpire. He stood in one ODI game in 2002.

See also
 List of One Day International cricket umpires

References

1958 births
Living people
Bangladeshi One Day International cricket umpires
People from Dhaka